The 1937 season was the Hawthorn Football Club's 13th season in the Victorian Football League and 36th overall.

Fixture

Premiership Season

Ladder

References

Hawthorn Football Club seasons